Luciano Manara (23 March 1825 – 30 June 1849) was a Milanese soldier and politician of the  Risorgimento era, who took part in the Roman Republic.

Life
Manara was born in Milan in 1825.

A friend of Carlo Cattaneo, in 1848 he participated in the Five Days of Milan (leading, among others, the operation that led to the capture of Porta Tosa) and in the First Italian War of Independence with a group of volunteers he had organised himself.  On the Austrians' return, he fled to Piedmont, where he was put at the head of a corps of bersaglieri, with whom he fought on the Po and at La Cava (now renamed Cava Manara after him).  

Fighting in defence of the Roman Republic and as Garibaldi's chief of staff, he died aged only 24 at the battle at Villa Spada on 30 June.  His funeral was held at the church of San Lorenzo in Lucina, with the homily spoken by Don Ugo Bassi.  For a short time his body remained in Rome, since his mother was unable to gain permission from the Austrian authorities in Vienna to have it taken to Milan.  With the remains of Emilio Morosini and Enrico Dandolo (the latter having been killed at Villa Corsini), it was eventually brought to Vezia (Lugano), where it was temporarily laid to rest in the family vault of the Morosini.  At Manara's mother's continued prayers and supplications, in 1853 the Austrian emperor Franz Joseph granted permission for the body to be taken to Barzanò (where the Manara family had a villa), so long as its progress and reburial there was "strictly private".  Only on Italy's unification in 1864 was the Manara family allowed to erect their family monument, in grey and white stone in the Romantic style, with a bas-relief portrayal of him beside a weeping veiled female figure (representing his mother or the Motherland).  The inscription on his monument reads: 

The monument is surrounded by a small park of cypress trees, with a chapel along whose two sides are ten white marble tombstones of equal size commemorating Luciano's sisters, Virginia in Manati and Deidamia, his wife Carmelita Fè and his three sons.

Notes

External links 

 Inscription at Milan
 Inscription at Antegnate.
 https://web.archive.org/web/20080529045458/http://www.comune.barzano.lc.it/index.html

1825 births
1849 deaths
Military personnel from Milan
Italian people of the Italian unification
Italian military personnel killed in action